The Senate of Palau is the upper house of the Palau National Congress (Olbiil era Kelulau). The Senate has 13 members serving four-year terms in multi-seat constituencies. No political parties exist. The most recent election was held on 3 November 2020.

Membership
The Constitution does not indicate the number of a members of the Senate. Every 8 years, the National Congress appoints a reapportionment commission to draw up and recommend a district map allocating seats in accordance with the population. Therefore, the number of senators may change as frequently as every 8 years. Any voter can challenge a reapportionment before the Palau Supreme Court.

During the first legislature in 1981, there were 18 Senators, which was reduced to 14 in 1984. In 2000, the number dropped to 9, but in 2008, the number rose to 13, before dropping again to 11 in 2016.

Committees
The Senate of Palau has 12 standing committees. They are:

Presidents of the Senate

References

External links
The Senate homepage

Palau
Government of Palau
Palau National Congress
1980 establishments in Palau